The Aztec Sandstone is an Early Jurassic geological formation of primarily eolian sand from which fossil pterosaur tracks have been recovered. The formation is exposed in the Mojave Desert of Arizona, California and Nevada. Aztec Sandstone is named after the Aztec Tank, a lake in the Spring Mountain region of Nevada.

Description 
The Aztec Sandstone is made up of two units. The lower resistant sandstone unit ( thick) is tan to off-white in outcrops but pinkish in fresh exposures. Crosbedded lenses can easily be observed. Frosted and pitted quartz grains well-cemented by silica are described by Evans in 1958 and 1971. The upper and less resistant unit (200m thick) consists of alternating white quartz arenites and red to brown silty sands.

Vertebrate paleofauna 
The formation has provided the following ichnofossils attributed to vertebrates:

See also 
 List of fossil sites
 List of fossiliferous stratigraphic units in California
 List of fossiliferous stratigraphic units in Nevada

References

Bibliography 

 
 Lockley, M.; Harris, J.D.; and Mitchell, L. 2008. "A global overview of pterosaur ichnology: tracksite distribution in space and time." Zitteliana. B28. p. 187-198. .
 
 Hilton, Richard P. 2003. Dinosaurs and Other Mesozoic Reptiles of California. Berkeley: University of California Press. 318 pp.

Further reading 
 R. E. Reynolds. 1986. California trackways from the Lower Jurassic Aztec Sandstone. In D. D. Gillette (ed.), First International Symposium on Dinosaur Tracks and Traces. Abstracts with Program 24

Geologic formations of Arizona
Geologic formations of California
Geologic formations of Nevada
Jurassic Arizona
Jurassic California
Jurassic geology of Nevada
Sandstone formations of the United States
Geologic formations with imbedded sand dunes
Aeolian deposits
Ichnofossiliferous formations
Paleontology in California
Paleontology in Nevada